Yaşma (also, Iachma, Jaschma, and Yashma) is a village in the Khizi Rayon of Azerbaijan.  The village forms part of the municipality of Şuraabad.

References 

Populated places in Khizi District